Newrangha is an area of Skardu District in Baltistan.

Populated places in Skardu District